North Carolina Highway 215 (NC 215) is a highway in western North Carolina that runs from the town of Rosman in Transylvania County to Canton at Interstate 40 and U.S. Route 74 (US 74). The portion from Canton to Rosman is a part of the US Forest Service's Forest Heritage Scenic Byway.

Route description
In Transylvania County, at the intersection with US 64 near Rosman, this road cuts through a path originally placed by the Gloucester Lumber Company, following the path of the North Fork of the French Broad River to its headwaters. Between US 64 and intersection of Macedonia Church Road (SR 1326), the highway has seven miles of narrow, winding, hairpin turns that are mostly surrounded by the Pisgah National Forest. In some areas the road is all that separates small mountain cliffs and steep ravines below the roadway. This route is characterized as having a dense leafy canopy for much of the way during the summer season.

Northward beyond Macedonia Church Road, the highway has broader shoulders and has entered Balsam Grove, and serves as the primary route in and out of the area. There is a solitary gas station in this area that serves as the only stop along the route until reaching Jackson County. 

Along the way, you will find several spots to pull over to the side of the road to take a break from the curves, allow faster traffic to move on, or to provide relief for a carsick passenger.

History
The highway defines the boundaries of the Shining Rock and Middle Prong wildernesses: Shining Rock lying to the east, and Middle Prong to the west. The right-of-way for the highway is all that separates the two for several miles, and several hiking trails start along parking areas on this road or on spur roads connecting to it. Several waterfalls along the West Fork or its tributaries can be seen from the road itself, especially during the winter after rainfall. Some can be accessed by hiking trails, but others are very remote making hiking to them difficult even though they can clearly be seen from the highway. This section of road is popular with tourists and with motorcyclists due to its curvy nature.

NC 215 was built on the right of way of two logging railroads.

Future
North Carolina Department of Transportation plans to modernize a  section of NC 215 between US 276 (Pigeon Road) to SR 1926 (Pisgah School Road). At an estimated cost of $13.8 million, it is currently unfunded.

Junction list

References

External links

NCRoads.com: N.C. 215
Forest Heritage National Scenic Byway

215
Transportation in Transylvania County, North Carolina
Transportation in Jackson County, North Carolina
Transportation in Haywood County, North Carolina
1967 establishments in North Carolina